Rashtra Kavach Om is a 2022 Indian action film directed by Kapil Verma and produced by Zee Studios and Ahmed Khan. It stars Aditya Roy Kapur, Sanjana Sanghi, Jackie Shroff, Ashutosh Rana, Prakash Raj and Prachee Shah Paandya. The film was released in theatre on 1 July 2022 and on ZEE5 on 11 August 2022.

Plot Summary 
A ship attack is coordinated by Murthy (special unit incharge) and Jai Rathore with permission of PM Vandana. The mission was to extract Kavach (an advanced nuclear disarming technology), which was led by para-commando Om Rathore. However, there is a power outage at co-ordination center and Om is shot in his head. It is revealed that Om is Jai's son.

3 months later, Kavya Sharma takes care of a comatose Om. When Om wakes up of childhood trauma, Rohit (a colleague of Om and Kavya) informs by kavya that Om is awake and he informs Jai, Murthy and Vandana about it. Om's place is attacked, but he is saved by Kavya. Om insists Kavya to take him to Kasauli 11 km marker, the clue to his childhood trauma. It is revealed that Om's father happens to be Dev Rathore, brother of Jai.

In a flashback; Dev, a brilliant nuclear scientist, proposes to Murthy and Jai to develop Kavach that would be India's defense against nuclear war with the help of DRDO. After approval, Dev is shown kidnapped by his colleagues and his house is burnt. Dev, separated from rishi by flames, tells him to run away. Jai arrives on the scene and saves Rishi. During interrogation, a helper reveals Dev burnt his house himself with 2 others, thus publicizing Dev as national traitor. Dev goes missing and Jai adopts Rishi. Following another accident in which Jai's real son Om dies due to an attack on his house killing Dev's house helper, Rishi adopts the name Om and grows up to become a para-commando.

In the present, Dev tests Kavach for auctioneers in Armenia. This activity is caught by Rohit and Dev is reconfirmed to be a traitor. Vandana decommissions the chase for Kavach, but Jai resolves to continue since he believes in Dev but he is shot dead. Om finds a flash drive left by Jai with a coded message for him to go to Armenia which is where the climax is set. It is revealed that Jai was killed by his own brother and best friend, both are involved in this crime. Om kill his own father and secure Kavach bringing it back to its rightful place.

In the aftermath; Om, Yashvi and Kavya mourn Jai's demise. Om gets a call for his next mission.

Cast
 Aditya Roy Kapur as Om Singh Rathore/Rishi Singh Rathore 
 Sanjana Sanghi as Kavya Sharma, Om's colleague and love interest
 Jackie Shroff as Dev Singh Rathore
 Prakash Raj as Murthy Sahay
 Ashutosh Rana as Jai Singh Rathore, Om's father
 Prachee Shah Paandya as Yashvi Jai Singh Rathore, Om's mother
 Bijou Thaangjam as Millitant Boss
 Elnaaz Norouzi as Item number in song "Kala Sha Kala"

Production 
The principal photography commenced on 3 December 2020 and wrapped up on 17 February 2021.

Music

The music of the film is composed by Arko Pravo Mukherjee, Amjad Nadeem Aamir, Chirantan Bhatt and Embee. Lyrics are written by Kumaar, Manoj Yadav and A. M. Turaz. The background score is composed by Amandeep Singh Jolly.

Release

Theatrical
The film was theatrically released worldwide on 1 July 2022.

Home media
The digital distribution rights were acquired by ZEE5. The film premiered on ZEE5 from 11 August 2022.

Controversy
In June 2022, the film title was changed from Om: The Battle Within to Rashtra Kavach OM due to makers facing trouble with regards to the title rights.

Reception 
Rashtra Kavach Om received negative reviews from critics. Ronak Kotecha of The Times of India rated the film 2.5 out of 5 stars and wrote "Rashtra Kavach Om is just as unreal and outlandish as its name, if not more. But if you're a diehard Aditya Roy Kapur fan then maybe this mission isn't all that doomed for you". Nairita Mukherjee of India Today rated the film 2 out of 5 stars and wrote "Aditya Roy Kapur's glistening biceps, though impressive, may not be strong enough to hold the weight of this strictly average actioner". Dishya Sharma of News 18 rated the film 2 out of 5 stars and wrote "Aditya Roy Kapur turns into an action hero but fails to pack the punch". Sanjana Jadhav of Pinkvilla rated the film 1.5 out of 5 stars and wrote "Rashtra Kavach OM is a messy and unsatisfying two-hour action film that has too many WTF moments to keep up with". Shubhra Gupta of The Indian Express rated the film 1.5 out of 5 stars and wrote "Aditya Roy Kapur-Sanjana Sanghi starrer is yet another addition to films Bollywood has adopted as a safe bet these days, with a hero who has patriotism oozing out of his pores".
A critic from Bollywood Hungama rated the film 1.5 stars out of five and said Rashtra Kavach Om is a poor show and will have a very tough time at the box office. Nandini Ramnath of Scroll.in rated the film 1 out of 5 stars and wrote "Kapur's Om is most alive when he's yelling the battle cry "Jai Bhavani!" with the fervour of a Shiv Sainik". Saibal Chatterjee of NDTV rated the film 1 out of 5 stars and wrote "Since there is no defence system that can reverse the ill effects of bad writing, Rashtra Kavach Om is never in with a chance of putting two sensible ideas together".

References

External links

 
Rashtra Kavach Om on ZEE5

Indian action thriller films
2022 films
2020s Hindi-language films